Palpimanus is a genus of palp-footed spiders that was first described by L. Dufour in 1820.

Species
 it contains thirty-six species, found in Africa, Asia, Europe, and Argentina:
Palpimanus aegyptiacus Kulczyński, 1909 – Egypt, Chad, Tunisia, Algeria
Palpimanus argentinus Mello-Leitão, 1927 – Argentina
Palpimanus armatus Pocock, 1898 – South Africa
Palpimanus aureus Lawrence, 1927 – Namibia
Palpimanus canariensis Kulczyński, 1909 – Canary Is.
Palpimanus capensis Simon, 1893 – South Africa
Palpimanus crudeni Lessert, 1936 – Mozambique
Palpimanus cyprius Kulczyński, 1909 – Cyprus, Syria, Israel
Palpimanus denticulatus Hernández-Corral & Ferrández, 2017 – Morocco
Palpimanus gibbulus Dufour, 1820 (type) – Mediterranean, Central Asia
Palpimanus giltayi Lessert, 1936 – Mozambique
Palpimanus globulifer Simon, 1893 – South Africa
Palpimanus hesperius Simon, 1907 – São Tomé and Príncipe
Palpimanus leppanae Pocock, 1902 – South Africa
Palpimanus lualabanus Benoit, 1974 – Congo
Palpimanus maroccanus Kulczyński, 1909 – Morocco, Algeria
Palpimanus meruensis Tullgren, 1910 – Tanzania
Palpimanus namaquensis Simon, 1910 – Namibia, South Africa
Palpimanus nubilus Simon, 1910 – Namibia
Palpimanus orientalis Kulczyński, 1909 – Albania, Greece, Turkey
Palpimanus paroculus Simon, 1910 – Namibia, South Africa
Palpimanus potteri Lawrence, 1937 – South Africa
Palpimanus processiger Strand, 1913 – Rwanda
Palpimanus pseudarmatus Lawrence, 1952 – South Africa
Palpimanus punctatus Kritscher, 1996 – Malta
Palpimanus sanguineus Strand, 1907 – South Africa
Palpimanus schmitzi Kulczyński, 1909 – Syria, Israel
Palpimanus simoni Kulczyński, 1909 – Syria, Lebanon, Israel
Palpimanus sogdianus Charitonov, 1946 – Turkey, Central Asia
Palpimanus stridulator Lawrence, 1962 – Namibia
Palpimanus subarmatus Lawrence, 1947 – South Africa
Palpimanus transvaalicus Simon, 1893 – South Africa
Palpimanus tuberculatus Lawrence, 1952 – South Africa
Palpimanus uncatus Kulczyński, 1909 – Greece, Turkey, Egypt
Palpimanus vultuosus Simon, 1897 – India
Palpimanus wagneri Charitonov, 1946 – Uzbekistan

See also
 List of Palpimanidae species

References

Araneomorphae genera
Palpimanidae
Spiders of Africa
Spiders of Asia
Spiders of South America